Cape Timberlake is a bold cape at the west side of the mouth of Skelton Glacier. Named by Advisory Committee on Antarctic Names (US-ACAN) in 1964 for Lieutenant Commander Lewis G. Timberlake, U.S. Navy, public works officer at McMurdo Station, 1962.

Headlands of the Ross Dependency
Hillary Coast